Vietnamese Lady is a 1992 Hong Kong sex film directed by Ka Ka and written by Heung Sang Kong, starring Gwok Yee Lee, Melvin Wong, Ling Ga, and Chan Wing Chun. The film premiered in British Hong Kong on 19 November 1992.

Plot summary
cantonese businessman Kiu doesn't have time to woo a girl. On a trip to Saigon, he offers financial help to poor girl Shun's (very troubled) family if she'll come and live with him. With a sense of duty but no love, she agrees, too timid to even tell boyfriend Lik just after losing her virginity to him. Love fails to blossom between Shun and Kiu in hong kong, and Kiu starts to drink heavily. Sandy, Kiu's luscious secretary takes advantage and gets it off with him in the gym and disgusts Shun in the process. Shun gets drunk and is picked up in a bar, nearly raped, and rescued then friended by a fellow Vietnamese girl, and a photographer, in what is clearly a set up. Sandy Turns out is behind this refuse as well, to get Shun out of the way and have Kiu all to herself. But things don't go according to anyone's plan. Will Shun give up Kiu and his money to go back to Lik? Will Sandy hold her nerve and push ahead? and Will the guys Sandy paid to set up Shun have their way with Sandy instead?

Cast
Gwok Yee Lee (郭绮莉) as yuen shun, the Vietnamese lady.
Melvin Wong as kiu man woo.
Ling Ga as Sandy.
Chan Wing Chun 
 Ho Chiu Kei as Sonny
Chuen Sing Lee
Jan Wai Ng

Release
It was released in British Hong Kong on 19 November 1992.

Box office
The film grossed HK$1,541,972.00.

References

External links

Films shot in Vietnam
Hong Kong erotic films
1990s pornographic films
Films set in Ho Chi Minh City
1990s Hong Kong films